The "Battle Cry of Freedom", also known as "Rally 'Round the Flag", is a song written in 1862 by American composer George Frederick Root (1820–1895) during the American Civil War. A patriotic song advocating the causes of Unionism and abolitionism, it became so popular that composer H. L. Schreiner and lyricist W. H. Barnes adapted it for the Confederacy.

A modified Union version was used as the campaign song for the Lincoln-Johnson ticket in the 1864 presidential election, as well as in elections after the war, such as for Garfield in the 1880 U.S. presidential election. The song was so popular that the music publisher had 14 printing presses going at one time and still could not keep up with demand. It is estimated that over 700,000 copies of this song were put in circulation. Louis Moreau Gottschalk thought so highly of the song that in his diary he confided that he thought "it should be our national anthem" and used it as the basis for his 1863 concert paraphrase for solo piano "Le Cri de délivrance," opus 55, and dedicated it to Root, who was a personal friend. Charles Ives quoted the song in several compositions, including his own patriotic song, "They Are There".

History
"Battle Cry of Freedom" proved popular among Union soldiers during the American Civil War. According to Henry Stone, a Union war veteran recalling in the late 1880s, the song helped the morale of Union soldiers:

According to historian Christian L. McWhirter, the song's success and popularity among the Union was due to its even-handed references to both abolitionism and unionism. Thus, both groups of Unionists, those opposed to slavery and secession, could utilize the song without reservation:

Lyrics (Union version)

Lyrics (Confederate version)

Chorus (1864 election campaign)

In popular culture

 The song is sung by a marching unit of Union infantry in the film The Undefeated (1969).
 Ry Cooder performed this song as "Rally 'Round the Flag" on his Boomer's Story album.
 The song is also performed in The Long Riders (1980), with music produced by Cooder. In the film, former Confederate irregular Clell Miller (played by Randy Quaid) confronts a musician playing this song, and forces him at gunpoint to play I'm a Good Ol' Rebel instead.
 Eric Taylor has a live recording of this song as "Rally 'Round the Flag" on his Hollywood Pocketknife album in 2007.
 Keith and Rusty McNeil perform both the "Battle Cry of Freedom" and "Southern Battle Cry of Freedom" on Civil War Songs with Historical Narration (WEM Records, 1989).
 This song features prominently in Ken Burns' documentary The Civil War, where it is performed by Jacqueline Schwab.
 Billy Bragg wrote a song based upon the music of "Battle Cry of Freedom" called "There Is Power in a Union" on the Talking with the Taxman about Poetry album. This song has different music and words than the song of the same name written by Joe Hill. For example, the chorus goes:The Union forever defending our rightsDown with the blackleg, all workers uniteWith our brothers and our sisters from many far off landsThere is power in a Union The song titled "Rally Round The Flag" was featured on Flamin' Groovies lead vocalist Chris Wilson's 1993 solo Record "Random Centuries"In which he sings all vocal harmonies, (based on Ry Cooder's version.)
 Homer and Jethro (Henry Haynes and Ken Burns) released a 1967 parody called "The Ballad of Roger Miller" that used music from "Battle Cry of Freedom" in the verses.
 Rally Round the Flag, Boys!, a 1958 film, was based on a novel with the same title by Max Shulman, published in 1956.  
 Indie rock band Titus Andronicus employ an adaptation of "Battle Cry of Freedom" in "A More Perfect Union", the first song on their Civil War-themed 2010 album The Monitor. The altered verses include references to Jefferson Davis, the Confederate leader, and abolitionist John Brown.
 Film composer John Williams, in his score for the 2012 Steven Spielberg film, Lincoln, used an excerpt from "The Battle Cry of Freedom" in the track "Call to Muster and Battle Cry", with vocals performed by the Chicago Symphony Chorus and music performed by the Chicago Symphony Orchestra.  The song is also sung by Republican members of the House of Representatives to celebrate passage of the 13th Amendment.
Elvis Costello sang and played the last lines of the song in the Two and a Half Men episode, "Back Off, Mary Poppins".
The song is played at the dedication of the Hill Valley Courthouse (clock tower) in Back to the Future Part III (1990).
The song is sung during the opening credits of the 1939 film Young Mr. Lincoln starring Henry Fonda and directed by John Ford.
The song is sung by Miriam Hopkins in the 1940 film Virginia City.
The song with possible lyrics from Ireland was sung by The Irish Rovers in Episode 1 of Season 7 of The Virginian.

See also
Battle cry
The Battle Hymn of the Republic

References

Notes

Bibliography
Collins, Ace. Songs Sung, Red, White, and Blue: The Stories Behind America's Best-Loved Patriotic Songs.  HarperResource, 2003.  
Irwin Silber, Songs of the Civil War, Dover, 1995.

External links

Battle Cry of Freedom  at Allmusic
Battle Cry of Freedom at Civil War Songs
Sheet music for "Battle Cry of Freedom", from Project Gutenberg
MIDI for "Battle Cry of Freedom", from Project Gutenberg
"Battle Cry of Freedom" (Union version),  Walter Van Brunt (Edison Blue Amberol 2904, 1916)—Cylinder Preservation and Digitization Project.
"Battle Cry of Freedom" Confederate/Union (music video), Tom Roush.

American patriotic songs
Songs of the American Civil War
Songs about freedom
1862 songs
Songs written by George Frederick Root